This is a list of cities, towns and villages within the ceremonial county of Leicestershire, England.

A
, Abbots Oak, Acresford, Allexton, Anstey, Arnesby, Asfordby, Atterton, Aylestone

B
Bagworth, Bardon, Barkby, Barlestone, Barsby, Barwell, Battleflat, Battram, Beeby, Belgrave, Belton, Belvoir,  Bescaby, Billesdon, Bilstone, Birstall, Bittesby,  Bitteswell, Blaby, Blackfordby, Blaston, Boothorpe, Botcheston, Bottesford, Boundary, Branston, Brascote, Braunstone, Brentingby, Bringhurst, Brooksby, Broughton Astley, Bruntingthorpe, Buckminster, Burbage, Bushby

C
Cadeby, Carlton, Catthorpe, Chadwell, Charley, Chilcote, Coalville, Coleorton, Congerstone, Cosby, Cossington, Coston, Cotes, Cotesbach, Coton, Countesthorpe, Cranoe, Croft, Cropston,

D
Dadlington, Desford, Diseworth, Dishley, Donisthorpe, Drayton,

E

F

G
Gaddesby, Garthorpe, Gaulby, Gelsmoor, Gilmorton, Glenfield, Glooston, Goadby, Goodwood, Gopsall, Greenhill, Griffydam, Grimston, Groby, Gumley

H
Hallaton, Halstead, Hamilton, Harby, Harston, Hathern, Heather, Hemington, Higham on the Hill, Highfields, Hinckley, Hoby, Holwell, Horninghold, Hose, Hoton, Houghton on the Hill, Hugglescote, Humberstone, Huncote, Hungarton, Husbands Bosworth

I
Ibstock, Illston, Ingarsby,

J

K
Kegworth, Keyham, Keythorpe, Kilby, Kimcote, Knaptoft, Knighton, Knipton, Knossington

L
, Laughton, Launde, Leesthorpe, Leicester, Leicester Castle, Leire, Lindley, Littlethorpe, Lockington, Loddington, Loughborough, Lount, Lowesby, Lubenham, Lutterworth

M
, Marefield, Market Bosworth, Market Harborough, Markfield, Measham, Medbourne, Melton Mowbray, Misterton, Moira, Mountsorrel, Mowmacre Hill, Mowsley, Muston

N
Nailstone, Nanpantan, Narborough, Nether Broughton, Nevill Holt, Newbold, Harborough, Newbold, North West Leicestershire, Newbold Verdon, Newton Burgoland, Newton Harcourt, Newtown Linford, Newtown Unthank, Normanton, Normanton le Heath, Norris Hill, North Evington, North Kilworth, Norton juxta Twycross, Noseley

O
Oadby, Oakthorpe, Odstone, Old Dalby, Orton on the Hill, Osbaston, Osbaston Hollow, Osgathorpe, Owston

P
Packington, Peatling Magna, Peatling Parva, Peckleton, Pickwell, Pinwall, Plungar, Potters Marston, Prestwold, Primethorpe, Packingshire

Q
Queniborough, Quorn

R
Ragdale, Ratby, Ratcliffe Culey, Ratcliffe on the Wreake, Ravenstone, Rearsby, Redmile, River Soar,  Rolleston, Rotherby, Rothley

S
Saddington, Saltby, Sapcote, Saxby, Saxelby, Scalford, Scraptoft, Seagrave, Sewstern, Shackerstone, Shangton, Sharnford, Shawell, Shearsby, Sheepy Magna, Sheepy Parva, Shenton, Shepshed, Shoby, Sibson, Sileby, Six Hills, Skeffington, Sketchley, Slawston, Smeeton Westerby, Smockington, Snarestone, Snibston, Soar Valley, Somerby, South Croxton, South Kilworth, South Knighton, South Wigston, Sproxton, Stanford Hall, Stanton under Bardon, Stapleford, Stapleton, Staunton Harold, Stathern, Stockerston, Stoke Golding, Stonesby, Stoney Stanton, Stoneygate, Stonton Wyville, Stoughton, Stretton en le Field, Sutton Cheney, Sutton in the Elms, Swannington, Swepstone, Swinford, Swithland, Sysonby, Syston

T
Theddingworth, Thornton, Thorpe Acre, Thorpe Arnold, Thorpe Astley, Thorpe Langton, Thorpe Satchville, Thringstone, Thrussington, Thurcaston, Thurlaston, Thurmaston, Thurnby, Tilton on the Hill, Tonge, Tugby, Tur Langton, Twycross, Twyford

U
Ullesthorpe, Ulverscroft, Upper Bruntingthorpe, Upton

V
Vale of Belvoir

W
Walcote, Waltham on the Wolds, Walton, Walton on the Wolds, Wanlip, Wartnaby, Welham, Wellsborough, Whatborough, Whetstone, Whitwick, Wigston, Wigston Fields, Wigston Parva, Willoughby Waterleys, Wilson, Wistow, Withcote, Witherley, Woodhouse, Woodhouse Eaves, Woodthorpe, Worthington, Wycomb, Wyfordby, Wykin, Wymeswold, Wymondham

See also
 List of settlements in Leicestershire by population
 List of places in England 

Leicestershire
places